The 1937 season of the Mitropa Cup football club tournament was won by Ferencváros who defeated Lazio 9–6 on aggregate in the final. It was their second victory in the competition, having previously won it in 1928. The two legs of the final were played on 12 September and 24 October.

This was the eleventh edition of the tournament, and the first edition to feature a team from Romania. Defending champions Austria Wien lost at the semifinal stage to eventual winners Ferencváros.

First round

|}
a Match decided by playoff.

First round playoffs

|}

Quarterfinals

|}
a Match decided by playoff.
b The second leg was not played; both teams were subsequently disqualified from the competition.

Quarterfinal playoff

|}

Semifinals

|}
 Lazio

Finals

|}

Top goalscorers

External links

References

1937–38
1937–38 in European football
1937–38 in Austrian football
1937–38 in Czechoslovak football
1937–38 in Hungarian football
1937–38 in Italian football
1938–39 in Romanian football
1937–38 in Swiss football